As of December 2019, Azimuth Airlines operates flights to 30 domestic destinations and 3 international destinations in three Eurasian countries: Russia, Armenia, and Kyrgyzstan.

Destinations

Notes

References

External links 

 Official website
 Flight map

Lists of airline destinations
Russia transport-related lists